Nothing Cool was an American punk rock band from Phoenix, Arizona (later relocating to San Francisco) in 1994. The band was formed in 1990 by vocalist/guitaris Jeff Bursley and guitarist Justin Berg.

Discography
Nothing Cool
Taking Advantage of Stupid People (1999) 
What a Wonderful World  (1997) 
Losers Hall Of Fame (1995)
Idiot Word Search w/ The Lillingtons (1996)
Nothing Cool / The Lillingtons (1996)
The Unluckiest Man In The Universe (1997)
Don't Tell Me What to Do (1995)

Members
 Jeremy Bellah – Vocal, Guitar (1990–)
 Theo Logian – Drums, Guitar, Vocal (1990–)
 Joe Phort – Guitar, Vocal (2009–)
 Will Farley – Guitar, Vocal (2009–)
 Neil Durkin – Bass, Drums, Vocal (2009–)
 Jimi Cheetah – Guitar, Bass, Vocals (1990–)
 Eric Zachman – Guitar, Vocal (1990–2000)
 Jeff Bursley – Bass, Vocal (1990–2001)

Tours
Japan 2004
Japan 2006
Europe/UK 2008

Musical groups established in 1990
Punk rock groups from Arizona
Punk rock groups from California
Musical groups from Phoenix, Arizona
Musical groups from San Francisco
Musical quartets
1990 establishments in Arizona